Ancilla tronsoni is a species of sea snail, a marine gastropod mollusk in the family Ancillariidae.

References

External links

tronsoni
Gastropods described in 1859